This is a recap of the 1977 season for the Professional Bowlers Association (PBA) Tour.  It was the tour's 19th season, and consisted of 36 events. Earl Anthony's string of three consecutive PBA Player of the Year awards was snapped by Mark Roth. Roth won four titles on the season and made numerous other top-five finishes to lead the Tour in earnings (over $105,000). 

Johnny Petraglia captured his second career major championship, winning the BPAA U.S. Open. Additional major titles for 1977 went to Mike Berlin (Firestone Tournament of Champions) and Tommy Hudson (Columbia PBA National Championship). Don Johnson collected his 26th career title, only to be caught and tied by Dick Weber the following week when Weber won his 26th. But both were now in Earl Anthony's rearview mirror, as the legendary lefthander earned his 27th and 28th titles during the season. For Johnson, his victory in Gretna, Louisiana in February gave him at least one title every season for the last 12 seasons – at the time, a PBA record.

Tournament schedule

References

External links
1977 Season Schedule

Professional Bowlers Association seasons
1977 in bowling